Alexandre Ziegler, born on 8 September 1969 in Paris, is Senior Executive Vice President, International and Public Affairs of Safran in France.

Biography
On 2 September 2019, Alexandre Ziegler was appointed Senior Executive Vice President, International and Public Affairs of Safran. He is also a member of the executive committee of the Safran Group.

Early life and education
He is a graduate from the Institut d'études politiques de Paris (Institute of Political Studies in Paris) Sciences Po (IEP – Paris, Public Service Section, batch of 1993) and an alumnus of the National School of Administration ( ENA, Marc Bloch batch,  1995–1997). After successfully graduating from ENA, he chose a diplomatic career, becoming a Counsellor of Foreign Affairs.

Career
He joined the French Ministry of Europe and Foreign Affairs, where he served in the Strategic, Security and Disarmament Affairs Division between 1997 and 2000.

His first foreign posting as a diplomat took him to Hong Kong, where he was Deputy Consul General from 2000 to 2003. He was next posted as First Secretary in Berlin from 2003 to 2007. In 2007, he was appointed as Counsellor for Cooperation and Cultural Action in Beijing, China, where he stayed until 2010.

In 2010, returning to the central administration in Paris, he was appointed Head of Programmes and Network at the Globalisation, Development, and Partnerships Division, Ministry of Foreign Affairs until 2012, when he was called to join the office of the Minister of Foreign Affairs.

Alexandre Ziegler was appointed as the Head of the Political Office (Directeur de Cabinet) of the then Minister of Foreign Affairs and International Development, Mr. Laurent Fabius, in June 2013. His tenure at the Minister's office was marked by two international events. The first led him to actively participate in the negotiations of the Paris Climate Agreement (COP21). The second event was the negotiation of the Joint Comprehensive Plan of Action, commonly known as the Vienna Agreement on the Iran nuclear programme.

On 10 May 2016, by decree of the President of the French Republic, Alexandre Ziegler was appointed Ambassador Extraordinary and Plenipotentiary of France to India, where he was posted until August 2019.

Marriage and children
Alexandre Ziegler is married to Véronique Ziegler, who is a teacher of history and geography. They have five children.

Awards/ Honours
He received the French distinction of Knight of the National Order of Merit (Chevalier de l’Ordre national du Mérite) on 14 November 2016.

References/Notes and references
Official biography on the website of the Embassy of France in India
 Our Defence Ties Have Never Been Stronger, Says French Ambassador To India Alexandre Ziegler
 French ambassador to India on the future of Indo-French ties
 We’re studying India’s plan for buying fighter jets: French envoy
 India has chosen Rafale because it is the best, in any major defence deal, there is confidentiality, says French ambassador
 Paris Je T’aime: This Admissions Season, Here’s Another Option

Further reading
Jean-Dominique Merchet, « Quai d'Orsay : Alexandre Ziegler, de Fabius à l'Inde », sur lopinion.fr, 10 février 2016.
 Etti Bali, « Talking literature, quite the French way with ambassador Alexandre Ziegler », sur hindustantimes.com, 14 janvier 2018.

References

External links
Website of the Embassy of France in India
Website of the French Ministry of Europe and Foreign Affairs
Website of the President of the French Republic

1969 births
Living people
Ambassadors of France to India
École nationale d'administration alumni
Knights of the Ordre national du Mérite